Carazolol is a high affinity inverse agonist (also referred to as a beta blocker) of the β-adrenergic receptor.

References

External links
 

Carbazoles
N-isopropyl-phenoxypropanolamines